Shun White (born December 9, 1985) is a former  American football wide receiver. White was born in Memphis, Tennessee, and lived there through High School where he attended Raleigh-Egypt High School.

College career
During college, he played for Navy where he played running back, White was Navy's sixth leading rusher of all time, he ran for a career-high 1,092 yards during his senior season in 2008 and set a Navy record when he rushed for 348 yards in a single game against Towson.

White was the 200-meter champion and finished second in the 100-meter dash at the Patriot League Outdoor Track & Field Championship, he holds the school record in the 60-meter dash with a time of 6.87 seconds.

Professional career

The New England Patriots signed White as an undrafted free agent following the 2009 NFL Draft, and he was later placed on the Reserve/Military list. White was released on March 28, 2013.

See also
 List of college football yearly rushing leaders

References

1985 births
Living people
American football wide receivers
New England Patriots players
Players of American football from Memphis, Tennessee